Cows in a River is an oil on canvas painting of 1650 by the Dutch Golden Age artist Aelbert Cuyp. 

It depicts frequent subjects of Cuyp's, cows, and was painted prior to the artist's decamping for Rhineland. The painting shows a group of five cows near the margin of a river, from which only one appears drinking. Several boats are seen, at the right, in the distance. The cloudy sky shows also several birds in their flight.

References

1650 paintings
Paintings by Aelbert Cuyp
Paintings in the collection of the Museum of Fine Arts (Budapest)